Dolichoderus carbonarius is a species of ant in the genus Dolichoderinae. Described by Emery in 1895, the species is only endemic to Malaysia.

References

Dolichoderus
Hymenoptera of Asia
Insects of Malaysia
Insects described in 1895